Bland High School may refer to:
 Bland High School, a public secondary school in the Bland Independent School District in Farmersville, Texas
 Bland High School (Bland County, Virginia), a secondary school in Rocky Gap, Virginia in the Bland County Public Schools district